Cory Cadden (February 21, 1969 – September 8, 2017) was a Canadian former professional ice hockey goaltender.

Prior to turning professional, Cadden played NCAA Division I hockey with the University of North Dakota men's ice hockey team.

Cadden died on September 8, 2017.

Awards and honours

References

External links

1969 births
2017 deaths
Anaheim Bullfrogs players
Atlanta Fire Ants players
Canadian ice hockey goaltenders
Dayton Bombers players
Knoxville Cherokees players
Lubbock Cotton Kings players
New Westminster Royals (BCHL) players
North Dakota Fighting Hawks men's ice hockey players
Pee Dee Pride players
Peoria Rivermen (ECHL) players
Saint John Flames players
Ice hockey people from Edmonton
South Carolina Stingrays players
Denver Daredevils players
Oakland Skates players